Bismuth phosphide is an inorganic compound of bismuth and phosphorus with the chemical formula BiP.

Synthesis
The reaction of sodium phosphide and bismuth trichloride in toluene (0 °C):

Na3P + BiCl3 -> BiP + 3NaCl

Physical properties
When heated in air, bismuth phosphide burns.

When heated in an atmosphere of carbon dioxide, a gradual volatilization of phosphorus is observed.

Chemical properties
This compound is oxidized when boiled in water.

All strong acids dissolve it.

Uses
The compound is a semiconductor used in high power, high frequency applications and in laser diodes.

References

Phosphides
Bismuth compounds
Semiconductors